The Church of Jesus Christ of Latter-day Saints (LDS Church) was established in the Hawaiian Islands in 1850, 11 years after the Edict of Toleration was decreed by Kamehameha III, giving the underground Hawaii Catholic Church the right to worship, and at the same time allowing other faith traditions to begin establishing themselves.

The church's first missionary to have success among the Hawaiians was George Q. Cannon. Among his earliest converts were men well-versed in the Hawaiian language, such as Jonatana Napela and Uaua.  After the construction of the Hawaii Temple, the Latter-day Saints founded the Church College of Hawaii, now Brigham Young University-Hawaii (BYU-Hawaii), along with the associated Polynesian Cultural Center (PCC), the state's largest living museum, and an entertainment center; which draws a million visitors annually. As the Latter-day Saint population in Hawaii continued to increase, a second church temple for the islands, the Kona Hawaii Temple, was completed in Kailua Kona on the island of Hawaii in 2000.

Hawaii has the highest concentration of Latter-day Saints of U.S. states that do not border Utah. The LDS Church is the 2nd largest denomination in Hawaii, behind the Roman Catholic Church.

History

The church's first ten missionaries departed San Francisco for Hawaii during the California Gold Rush on the ship Imaum of Muscat, arriving on December 12, 1850, in Honolulu Harbor of what was then known as the Sandwich Islands.  With Hiram Clark presiding, the missionaries included Henry Bigler, Hiram Blackwell, George Q. Cannon, John Dixon, William Farrer, James Hawkins, James Keeler, Thomas Morris, and Thomas Whittle.  A day after their arrival the group climbed a hill above Honolulu (Pacific Heights), constructed a small, makeshift altar and said a prayer.  A week later, the ten missionaries received their assignments: Farrer and Dixon headed to the island of Kaua'i, Cannon, Keeler, and Bigler to Lahaina on the island of Maui, Blackwell and Hawkins to the Big Island of Hawaii, with Morris, Whittle, and Clark staying behind in Honolulu.  This group formed the basis of the Sandwich Islands Mission.  The church's first congregation in Hawaii was established on the island of Maui in 1851.  Among the early converts of Cannon were three prominent native Hawaiians: Napela, Uaua and Kaleohano who would later serve as prominent missionaries and leaders in the LDS Church.

Missionaries lead a group of Hawaiian Latter-day Saints in establishing a colony on the island of Lānai in 1854.  In 1857, the American missionaries left due to the Utah War.  No new missionaries came until Walter M. Gibson arrived in 1861.  Gibson instituted irregular activities such as selling the priesthood.  Some local leaders, such as Napela, sent letters to Salt Lake City asking for Gibson to be replaced.  In response, Ezra T. Benson and Lorenzo Snow of the church's Quorum of the Twelve Apostles were sent to take over the leadership of the mission, with the assistance of Joseph F. Smith, who had been a missionary in Hawaii for much of the 1850s.  Most of the membership followed Benson, Snow, and Smith, but in the process ownership of the property on Lanai was lost.  A new colony for Hawaiian Latter-day Saints was established in Lāie.

In 1889, Iosepa, Utah was founded as a colony for Hawaiian Latter-day Saints.  This colony functioned until 1915 when the saints there were encouraged to return to Hawaii in anticipation of the building of a temple there.  The first stake in Hawaii was organized in 1935.

In 1937, the Japanese Mission was organized in Hawaii to focus on teaching the ethnic Japanese in Hawaii.  This mission existed until 1950 when it was merged into the Hawaiian mission.

County Statistics
List of LDS Church adherents in each county as of 2010 according to the Association of Religion Data Archives:

Temples

The Laie Hawaii Temple, formerly known as the Hawaiian Temple or the Hawaii Temple until a standard naming convention for LDS temples was adopted in the early 2000s, is located on the northeast shore of the island of Oahu.  The temple sits on a small hill a half-mile from the Pacific Ocean in the town of Laie,  from Honolulu.  Along with BYU-Hawaii and the PCC, the temple plays an important role in the town of Laie, with the temple Visitors' Center attracting more than 100,000 people annually.

The Hawaii Temple was the first temple the LDS Church built outside of the continental United States. The temple is also the oldest to operate outside of Utah, and the fifth-oldest still in operation. The site of the temple was dedicated by church president Joseph F. Smith on June 1, 1915, and the completed structure was dedicated by church president Heber J. Grant on November 27, 1919.

The Kona Hawaii Temple became the church's seventieth temple, announced on May 7, 1998.  Located in the town of Kailua-Kona on the island of Hawaii, the site of Kona Hawaii Temple was dedicated on March 13, 1999.  The structure itself was constructed in concrete, white marble and some native materials.  Architects used a simple classical design featuring a single spire.  The completion and official dedication was celebrated on January 23, 2000 by church president Gordon B. Hinckley.

See also

 The Church of Jesus Christ of Latter-day Saints membership statistics (United States)
 Religion in Hawaii

Notes

References

.
.
.

Further reading

External links
 Newsroom (Hawaii)
 ComeUntoChrist.org Latter-day Saints Visitor site
 The Church of Jesus Christ of Latter-day Saints Official site
 Deseret News 2010 Church Almanac - Hawaii

 
Hawaii